Attnang-Puchheim is a railway station   in the town of Attnang-Puchheim, Upper Austria, Austria. The train services are operated by ÖBB and WESTbahn. The station is served by regional services as well as Intercity and EuroNight services.

Train services
The station is served by the following services:

References

External links

Austrian Railway (ÖBB) website 

Railway stations in Upper Austria